Power Lunch is a play by writer/director Alan Ball.

-the immature, improbable, sometimes interchangeable secret notions of a man and woman trying to balance their urges to compete, copulate, and connect. - The Chicago Reader 1992

The play was performed on the Irish One Act Drama Circuit in 2015 and won the All Ireland Final in Galway on the 6th of December of that year.

The Bradán Players Cast and Crew were:

Woman:			Helena Stout
Man:			George Hogan
Waiter:			Vincent Casey
Waitress:		Michelle Reade

Director:		Jenny Ní Lúcáis
Stage Manager:		Naoise NigFhloinn
Lighting:		Barry Donaldson
Sound:			Joe Bergin
Set Design:		Jenny Ní Lúcáis
Choreography:		Sinéad McLoughlin		

 

Plays by Alan Ball